Jaishankar Menon (born: 09 August 1956) is an Indian-American computer scientist and researcher.

Life and career 

Menon joined IBM's research team in San Jose, California, in 1982, where he developed RAID (Redundant Array of Independent Disks) technology.

Awards

 IBM Fellow, 2001
 IEEE Fellow
 Winner of the 2002 IEEE W. Wallace McDowell Award
 2006 IEEE Reynold B. Johnson Information Storage Systems Award
 IBM Master Inventor

External links
 Profile

References

1956 births
2022 deaths
American computer scientists
Computer systems researchers
Fellow Members of the IEEE
IBM Fellows
IIT Madras alumni
Ohio State University College of Engineering alumni